Sergio Arboleda University is a university located in Bogotá, Colombia, with sectionals located in Santa Marta, Colombia and in Madrid, in Spain.

References

Serge Arboleda University